The Benson  Block is a historic building located in downtown Ottumwa, Iowa, United States. It is two-fifths of a building that was originally constructed in 1883 and was damaged in a fire in 1923. This part of the building was re-constructed as a theatre, but because it lacked a sufficient number of exits, was never used for that purpose. It is noteworthy for the decorative Neoclassical white terra cotta cladding on the façade, which enabled its owners to transform its original appearance. The building was listed on the National Register of Historic Places in 1985. In 2016, it was included as a contributing property in the Greater Second Street Historic District.

References

Theatres completed in 1924
Neoclassical architecture in Iowa
Buildings and structures in Ottumwa, Iowa
Commercial buildings on the National Register of Historic Places in Iowa
Theatres on the National Register of Historic Places in Iowa
National Register of Historic Places in Wapello County, Iowa
Individually listed contributing properties to historic districts on the National Register in Iowa